The 1958 Australian Drivers' Championship was a CAMS sanctioned Australian motor racing competition for drivers of Formula Libre cars. It was the second Australian Drivers' Championship. The title was contested over a nine race series with the winner awarded the 1958 CAMS Gold Star.

The championship was won by Stan Jones, driving a Maserati 250F.

Calendar

Winning driver not awarded points for races 1 and 8

Points structure
Championship points were awarded on an 8-5-3-2-1 basis to the top five finishers in each race.
However, as overseas drivers were ineligible to qualify for championship points, no points were awarded for placings scored by these drivers. Similarly drivers of sports cars which on occasion raced amongst the Formula Libre cars, were not eligible for points, although Doug Whiteford's Maserati 300S appears to have been an exception.

Results

Championship points were not awarded for the following:
 Jack Brabham (Cooper T43 Climax) :  First place in Race 1
 Bill Pitt (Jaguar D-Type) : Fourth place in Race 1
 Bill Pitt (Jaguar D-Type) : Fourth place in Race 5
 Bill Pitt (Jaguar D-Type) : Fourth place in Race 6
 Merv Neil (Cooper T45 Climax) : Fourth place in Race 7
 Stirling Moss (Cooper T45 Climax) :  First place in Race 8
 Jack Brabham (Cooper T45 Climax) :  Second place in Race 8

References

Further reading

 Australian Grand Prix - The 50-race history, 1986, pages 236 to 246
 The Advertiser, Monday 7 April 1958, Page 19

External links
 Australian Drivers’ Championship – CAMS Gold Star, motorsport.org.au, as archived at web.archive.org 
 Open Wheelers 1958, autopics.com.au

Australian Drivers' Championship
Drivers' Championship